The Patriot (Persian: Mihan-parast) is a 1953 Iranian drama film directed by Gholam-Hossein Naghshineh.

Cast 
 Ali Tabesh
 Taghi Zohouri
 Hamideh Kheirabadi
 Gholam-Hossein Naghshineh
 Mohammad Reza Zandi
 Hossein Mohseni

References

Bibliography 
 Mohammad Ali Issari. Cinema in Iran, 1900-1979. Scarecrow Press, 1989.

External links 
 

1953 films
1950s Persian-language films
Iranian drama films
1953 drama films
Iranian black-and-white films